Jack Rigby (1924–1997) was a footballer who played as a centre half in the Football League for Manchester City.

References

Manchester City F.C. players
People from Golborne
Association football central defenders
1924 births
1997 deaths
Peterborough United F.C. players
English Football League players
English footballers